The 2018 Buffalo Bulls football team represented the University at Buffalo in the 2018 NCAA Division I FBS football season. The Bulls were led by fourth-year head coach Lance Leipold and played their home games at the University at Buffalo Stadium as members of the East Division of the Mid-American Conference. They finished the season 10–4, 7–1 in MAC play to be champions of the East Division. They represented the East Division in the MAC Championship Game where they lost to West Division champion Northern Illinois. They were invited to the Dollar General Bowl where they lost to Troy. Their 10 wins are the most in program history with the previous best being eight wins set in 2008.

Previous season
The Bulls finished the 2017 season 6–6, 4–4 in MAC play to finish in a tie for third place in the East Division. Despite being bowl-eligible, the Bulls did not receive an invitation to a bowl game.

Preseason

Award watch lists
Listed in the order that they were released

Preseason media poll
The MAC released their preseason media poll on July 24, 2018, with the Bulls predicted to finish in second place in the East Division.

Schedule

Source:

Game summaries

Delaware State

at Temple

Eastern Michigan

at Rutgers

Army

at Central Michigan

Akron

at Toledo

Miami (OH)

Kent State

at Ohio

at Bowling Green

vs. Northern Illinois (MAC Championship Game)

vs. Troy (Dollar General Bowl)

Roster

References

Buffalo
Buffalo Bulls football seasons
Buffalo Bulls football